David Rees is a South African actor and producer. He is best known for the roles in the films such as American Ninja 4: The Annihilation, Egoli: Afrikaners is Plesierig and Agter elke man.

Personal life
Since teenage years, Rees had an alcoholic life, where he also used to smoke dagga for 20 years. In 2007 he underwent rehabilitation process under The Addiction Action Campaign (AAC) after his life was addicted to alcohol and drugs.

He is married to his longtime partner Lina.

Career
In 1990, he acted in the blockbuster film American Ninja 4: The Annihilation. Then in 1992, he joined with the M-Net soap opera Egoli: Place of Gold and played the role "Nick Naudé". The soapie made huge popularity, where he continued to play the role for 18 consecutive years until 2010 where he was fired for causing trouble. After that, he joined with another television serial Hartland and played the role "Boetman". Apart from that, he also appeared in many popular television serials such as; Binnelanders, and Roer Jou Voete.

In 2016, he joined the cast of the SABC2 soap opera 7de Laan, and played the role "Chris Welman", the father of the Welman family. He continued to play the role until July 2018. However in 2020, he returned to the soapie and reprised his role.

Filmography

References

External links
 

Living people
South African male film actors
Year of birth missing (living people)